Bernardino Tamames Alonso (born August 15, 1973 in Lleida) was a Spanish basketball player. He currently works as a Guardia Urbana officer in  Lleida.

Player career 
1991/92  FC Barcelona B
1992/95  FC Barcelona Banca Catalana
1995/96  Festina Andorra
1996/00  Gran Canaria
2000/01  Caja San Fernando
2001/07  Plus Pujol Lleida

Honours 
FC Barcelona

ACB Champion: 1
1995

Plus Pujol Lleida

ACB Catalan League Champion: 2
2002, 2003

Spain

Universiade Bronze Medal: 1
1999

External links
Berni Tamames profile

1973 births
Living people
BC Andorra players
Spanish expatriate basketball people in Andorra
CB Gran Canaria players
Real Betis Baloncesto players
FC Barcelona Bàsquet players
Liga ACB players
Spanish men's basketball players
Centers (basketball)